Wiehan Hay (born 2 February 1992 in Kempton Park, South Africa) is a South African rugby union player for Cognac-Saint Jean D'Angely in the Fédérale 1 in France. His regular position is lock, but he has also played prop at youth level.

Career

Youth

He represented East Rand side  at the Under-16 Grant Khomo Week in 2008, as well as the Under-18 Craven Week in 2010, where he played as a tighthead prop.

Sharks

His first class debut came during the 2013 Vodacom Cup when he was included in the run-on side that played beat the  34–33 in a match in Durban. He was named in their Currie Cup squad for the 2014 Currie Cup Premier Division and made his first appearance in this competition in their match against  in Durban, but was forced off through an injury in the first half. He was released by the Sharks in November 2015.

References

South African rugby union players
Living people
1992 births
People from Kempton Park, Gauteng
Rugby union locks
Sharks (Currie Cup) players
Rugby union players from Gauteng